Clusterpoint is a European software technology company developing and supporting the Clusterpoint database management system platform.

For most of its history Clusterpoint was servicing business customers as an enterprise software vendor.

Clusterpoint database 
Clusterpoint is a schema-free document database.

Examples are where SQL RDBMS data is used in combination with an enterprise search engine to address performance and scalability needs of web and mobile applications, or where Big data and analytics tools such as Hadoop might be needed due to sheer volume of data or large computing workloads.

General features
 Data is managed in open, cross-platform, industry standard XML or JSON format using open API, for instance, Python API or JavaScript Node.js API
 Data structure agnostic and type-rich database, handles variable data structure XML or JSON documents in a single database. Supports unstructured textual data, dates, numbers, meta-data (all XML and JSON types)
 Cross-platform support: binaries are available for Linux, FreeBSD, Mac OS X and Windows. Clusterpoint database software can be compiled on other operating systems.
 Multi-master cluster software architecture: any cluster node can serve as a master and run the management application
 Horizontal database scalability: scales out from a single server to few thousands of servers networked into a cluster infrastructure

Clusterpoint products
 Clusterpoint DBMS: Clustered NoSQL database, which uses approach of multiple server system to spread load and increase performance. Clusterpoint database facilitates high parallelism of computing and distribution of data.
 GOL: Big Data SIEM Analytics tool from Clusterpark  Log, Events and Security Records Search and Analytics.
 DigiBrowser: Quick SQL denormalization into NoSQL database  imports multi-table SQL database into one Clusterpoint database using automagic denormalization.
 NTSS: Network Traffic Surveillance System for Lawful Intercept  High-speed capture, store, search and analysis of all Internet traffic for the corporate network.

References

Proprietary database management systems
Document-oriented databases
XML databases
Distributed computing architecture
NoSQL
XML
Database-related software for Linux